Shannon is a steam locomotive, built in 1857 George England and Co. for the Sandy and Potton Railway and now preserved at the Didcot Railway Centre.

History
The locomotive was built in 1857 by George England and Co. of New Cross for the Sandy and Potton Railway, at a cost of £800. The railway was promoted by Captain Sir William Peel VC, whose estate lay between those towns, and the locomotive was named after his ship, the frigate HMS Shannon. In 1862 it was sold to the London and North Western Railway (LNWR) for shunting at Crewe Works and numbered 1104. The LNWR also briefly tried it out on the Cromford and High Peak Railway. It was renumbered 1863 in 1872.

In 1878 it was sold to the Wantage Tramway for £365 8s 1d where it became No 5, and was known as 'Jane' although the name was never actually carried. It was initially fitted with full tramway skirts, but these were removed after a few years. After closure of the tramway in 1945 it was purchased for £100 by the Great Western Railway and the name 'Shannon' was reapplied. It was preserved as a static exhibit on Wantage Road railway station until that closed in 1964. In 1965 it was stored on the premises of the Atomic Energy Authority but in 1969 it was moved to the Didcot Railway Centre, where it was finally steamed and operated again in October 1969. 

No. 5 Shannon is part of the UK National Collection of railway locomotives (Object No.1978-7013). In 1975 it took part in the 150th anniversary celebrations of the Stockton and Darlington Railway in steam, but had to be retired soon afterwards due to a crack in the firebox tubeplate.

When first restored at Didcot, no.5 was painted in Great Western Railway colours, which is how it appeared on the tramway following repair at Swindon in the 1930s. This also accounts for several GWR fittings on the locomotive. More recently, it has been repainted in lined maroon, in an approximation of the first livery carried when on the tramway.

See also

List of rolling stock items in the UK National Collection

References 

Preserved steam locomotives of Great Britain
George England and Company locomotives
Wantage Tramway
0-4-0WT locomotives
Standard gauge steam locomotives of Great Britain